Marion Lloyd (later Vince, April 16, 1906 – November 2, 1969) was an American foil fencer. She competed at the 1928, 1932 and 1936 Summer Olympics and placed eighth in 1932. She won the American junior title in 1926 and the senior AFLA title in 1928 and 1931. During her fencing career she worked as a secretary at the National City Corp.

References

External links
 

1906 births
1969 deaths
American female foil fencers
Olympic fencers of the United States
Fencers at the 1928 Summer Olympics
Fencers at the 1932 Summer Olympics
Fencers at the 1936 Summer Olympics
Sportspeople from Brooklyn
20th-century American women